Blears is a surname. Notable people with the surname include:

Brian Blears (1933–2005), Welsh footballer
Hazel Blears (born 1956), British politician
Laura Lee Ching (née Blears; born 1951), American surfer
Lord James Blears (1923–2016), British-American wrestler, ring announcer, promoter, actor, and surfer
Jimmy Blears (1948–2011), American surfer